Dress Gray is a 1986 American television miniseries starring Alec Baldwin, Lloyd Bridges and Hal Holbrook. The program, about a cadet at a West Point-like military academy who investigates the murder of a fellow cadet, was adapted for the screen by Gore Vidal from the novel of the same name by Lucian Truscott IV. Dress Gray originally aired March 9–10, 1986 on NBC.

Plot
Dress Gray is set during the era of the Vietnam War. A new class of cadets arrives at the Ulysses S. Grant Military Academy for its 100th anniversary. Ten months later one of those new cadets, David Hand (Patrick Cassidy), is found dead, apparently drowned despite being a top swimmer. Following an autopsy,  academy physician Major Consor (Ron Rifkin) informs the investigating officer, Colonel King (Lane Smith), that Hand was murdered and possibly raped. With the school under public scrutiny in the wake of recent drug and cheating scandals, the commandant, Brigadier General Charles Hedges (Hal Holbrook), initiates a cover-up. Upper classman Rysam Slaight (Alec Baldwin) learns of the cover-up and soon finds himself not only the prime suspect in Hand's murder but also the target of a false honor code violation accusation as well as an independent investigation implemented by Judge Hand (Eddie Albert), Cadet Hand's wealthy and powerful father.

As Slaight seeks to clear his name, he learns that the manipulative Hand was gay and in love with him, a fact David revealed to his sister Elizabeth (Susan Hess), whom Slaight used to date. Elizabeth and Ry rekindle their romance and work together to solve David's murder. They discover that a USGA cadet had visited David's high school on a recruiting trip. David got the cadet drunk, took him to a hotel and took sexual advantage of him.

General Hedges threatens to have Slaight charged with murder, but Slaight counters that he will have the general charged with obstruction of justice. Stymied, the General induces a member of the academy's Honor Court to file a charge of lying against Slaight.

Elizabeth visits the hotel where David took the cadet and the manager signs an affidavit identifying the cadet from his photograph. Over her father's objections, Elizabeth has the affidavit delivered to Ry, who is before the Court. Slaight identifies Cadet Winant as the man who was with David in the hotel and who later raped and killed him.

Slaight is cleared by the Honor Court and reports to Elizabeth that Winant will be locked in a mental institution for a year or two. General Hedges tenders his resignation as Commandant of Students. Slaight plans to resign from the academy but following a talk with Superintendent Axel Rylander (Lloyd Bridges) decides to stay and graduate.

Cast
 Eddie Albert as Judge Hand
 Alec Baldwin as Rysam 'Ry' Slaight
 Lloyd Bridges as Major General Axel Rylander, Superintendent, USGA
 Patrick Cassidy as David Hand
 Susan Hess as Elizabeth Hand
 Hal Holbrook as Gen. Charles Hedges
 Alexis Smith as Mrs. Iris Rylander
 Lane Smith as Col. King
 James Sikking as Maj. Clifford Bassett
 Albert Salmi as Sgt. Oliphant
 Ron Rifkin as Maj. Consor
 Timothy Van Patten as Lugar
 Cameron Dye as Buck
 Peter Nelson as Barnes
 Louise Latham as Mrs. Loerna Tutwiler
 Jason Beghe as Hank Beaumont
 Gary Kasper as Cullinan
 Joseph Kell as Winant

Production
Truscott, who attended West Point,  reportedly based Dress Gray on fact. The project was first adapted by Vidal in 1979 as a planned theatrical film, with Herbert Ross attached to direct. Ultimately Glenn Jordan, who also produced, directed the series. The project filmed on location at the New Mexico Military Institute in Roswell.

Critical and popular response
Writing for The New York Times, John J. O'Connor described Dress Gray as "absorbing, but...never quite as powerful as it clearly intends". He questioned the casting of Holbrook and Albert while singling out Baldwin, Hess, Cassidy and Bridges for particular praise.

While perceiving some weaknesses in the overall story, the Chicago Tribune found that Dress Gray was "entertaining and a cut above most mini-series" although declaring Baldwin to be not a strong enough actor to carry off the heroics required of the lead role.

The Orlando Sentinel sharply criticized Vidal's script, calling the program "turbid" and "unpleasant" in large measure because of Vidal's "wooden, often inscrutable dialogue that makes some fine actors...look silly".

Part one of the miniseries finished 24th for the week in the Nielsen ratings.

Awards and nominations
Dress Gray was nominated for three Emmy Awards: Outstanding Miniseries; Outstanding Writing in a Miniseries or Special; and Outstanding Achievement in Costuming For a Miniseries or Special.

See also
 List of dramatic television series with LGBT characters

References
Notes

Bibliography
 Russo, Vito (1981, rev. ed. 1987). The Celluloid Closet: Homosexuality In the Movies. New York, HarperPerennial (a division of HarperCollins). .

External links
 

1986 American television series debuts
1980s American drama television series
1980s American LGBT-related drama television series
1986 LGBT-related films
American LGBT-related films
1980s American television miniseries
NBC original programming
Films directed by Glenn Jordan
Films with screenplays by Gore Vidal
1986 television films
1986 films
1980s American films